Patna Regional Development Authority abbreviated as PRDA, is a body of the Government of Bihar that is responsible for the infrastructure development of the Patna Metropolitan Region (PMR). It was established by the Bihar State Government with the sole purpose of the developing the infrastructure of the Patna Metropolitan Region. After Enactment of Bihar Municipal Act 2007, it is now merged into Patna Municipal Corporation.

Overview
After disbanding Patna Improvement Trust, the PRDA was set up in 1975 and was formed in 1979 under the provision of Patna Regional
Development Authority act 1978 for preparation of Regional Plan, Master Plan and Zonal Plan.

Patna Master Plan
In October 2016, Bihar cabinet approved the Patna master plan 2031 which envisages development of Bihta Airport. Bihar government is acquiring 126 acres of land for construction of the new airport. 17.6 km2 of area in Dumri Village in Punpun block of Patna (PMR) has been allocated for IT Park.

Jurisdiction
The area of jurisdiction of Patna Regional Development Authority covers an approximately 234.70 Square Kilometers comprising
Within Patna district: The Patna Urban Agglomeration area which comprises Patna Municipal Corporation Area (PMC), Danapur Cantonment Area, Danapur Nagar Palika Parishad area, Khagaul Nagar Palika Parishad area, Phulwari Sharif Nagar Palika Parishad area. Apart from these it also consists of Fatuha Nagar Parisad area, Maner Nagar Panchayat area and 104 villages.
Within Vaishali district: Hajipur Nagar Parisad area and 99 villages around Hajipur Nagar Panchayat area.
Within Saran district: Sonepur Nagar Panchayat Area and 19 villages around Sonepur Nagar Panchayat area.

See also
Bihar Urban Infrastructure Development Corporation
Patna Municipal Corporation

References

External links

1979 establishments in Bihar
2007 disestablishments in India
Government agencies established in 1979
Government agencies disestablished in 2007
State urban development authorities of India
Government of Patna
State agencies of Bihar